The Doftana is a left tributary of the river Prahova in Romania. It discharges into the Prahova in Bănești near Câmpina. It flows through the villages Trăisteni, Teșila, Seciuri, Brebu Mânăstirei, Doftana and the city Câmpina. The upper reach of the river, upstream of the confluence with the Urlățelu is also called Predeluș or Doftănița.

Tributaries

The following rivers are tributaries to the river Doftana (from source to mouth):

Left: Urlățelu, Neagra, Negraș, Mogoșoaia, Erniereasa, Vâlceaua Vlădișor, Păltinoasa, Valea Grecilor, Valea Rea, Purcaru
Right: Mușița, Glodeasa, Orjogoaia, Valea Seacă, Prislop, Florei, Secăria

References

Rivers of Romania
Rivers of Prahova County